Henri Guidet (29 March 1912 – 29 May 1982) was a French politician. He served as a member of the National Assembly from 12 March 1967 to 30 May 1968, representing Pas-de-Calais.

References

1912 births
1982 deaths
People from Pas-de-Calais
Politicians from Hauts-de-France
French Section of the Workers' International politicians
Deputies of the 3rd National Assembly of the French Fifth Republic